Ceylonitermellus kotuae, is a species of termite of the genus Ceylonitermellus. It is endemic to Sri Lanka, first described from Kotuwa area of Galle. It is a soil-dwelling and soil-feeding termite species.

References

External links
Diversity and Abundance of Termites in a Mahogany Plantation in the Gannoruwa Hills
Biodiversity Conservation and Management Species richness, abundance and feeding habits of termites in three montane forest types in the Knuckles Region

Termites
Insects described in 1914